Long View of London from Bankside is a panoramic etching made by Wenceslas Hollar in Antwerp in 1647. It depicts a panorama of London, based on drawings done while Hollar was in London in the early 1640s.  Unlike earlier panoramas of London, Hollar's panorama takes a single viewpoint, the tower of St Saviour in Southwark (now Southwark Cathedral), from where he made the drawings. It shows the River Thames curving sinuously from left to right past the viewpoint.

Background
Hollar was born in Prague. After spending time in Stuttgart, Strasburg, and Cologne, he travelled with Thomas Howard, 21st Earl of Arundel to Vienna and Prague and then accompanied Lord Arundel when he returned to England in 1627. He remained in the Earl's household in England for several  years.

Lord Arundel was a recusant Roman Catholic; he left England in 1642 on a diplomatic mission and did not return before his death in 1646.  Hollar passed into the service of the Duke of York (later King James II), but Hollar left London himself in 1644 to escape the English Civil War.  After eight years in Antwerp, he returned to London in 1652, where he died in 1677.

Print

The work was etched on six plates, with the two ends printed from a single plate so the impression must be cut in half to assemble the full panorama. The prints were published by Cornelis Danckerts.

The panorama includes, from left to right, on the north bank, on the first plate, the Palace of Whitehall, Scotland Yard, Suffolk House, York House, and Durham House; on the second plate, Salisbury House, the New Exchange on the Strand, the Savoy, Somerset House, Arundel House, Covent Garden, Essex House, the Temple and St Clement Danes, Blackfriars, and Baynard's Castle; on the third plate, Queenhithe, St Andrew's, Holborn, Old St Paul's Cathedral, with Highgate Hill behind in the distance; on the fourth plate, the Steelyard, Bow Church, the Guildhall, Coalharbour, All-Hallows-the-Great, St Laurence Pountney, the Royal Exchange, The Old Swan, St Michael's, St Peter's, Fishmongers' Hall, St Magnus-the-Martyr, Old London Bridge, Greyfriars, St Dunstan-in-the-East, Billingsgate, All Hallows-by-the-Tower, the Customs House, the Tower of London, and meanders of the River Thames past St Katharine Docks towards Greenwich.  On the south bank are the Bankside theatres the Globe and Hope (mislabelled), Winchester House, Southwark, and St Olave's.  Each large sheet frames a particular view: the Bankside theatres, St Paul's Cathedral, the City and Southwark, the Bridge, and the Tower.  Downstream of London Bridge, the Pool of London throngs filled with a variety of ocean-going vessels.

The view is not entirely accurate, with some alignments adjusted for aesthetic effect.  For example, St Paul's Cathedral is depicted too far west, and St Olave's in line with the Tower.  Hollar's dependence on old drawings is demonstrated by the presence of the Globe Theatre (mislabelled as "Beere bayting", that is the Beargarden) in a print made three years after it was demolished.  Copying an error in the 1616 Visscher panorama, the round theatre labelled "The Globe" is actually the Hope).  The Swan and the Rose theatres had fallen into disuse by the 1630s.

Various decorative elements are arranged around the scene.  To the lower left of the first plate is a symbolic figure representing the law (with a sword) above a dedication to Mary, daughter of the Duke of York and wife of William of Orange, the future Queen Mary II, (EDIT - in fact this is Mary Stuart, Charles II's and James II's sister, who was married to William Prince of Orange, father to William III. James's daughter, who would become Queen Mary, was not born until 1662, so this Mary is not Queen Mary) and a poem to "Nympha Britannorum", with an inset panel denoted with an asterisk continuing the panorama to the left past Westminster Hall and Westminster Abbey; overhead are three cherubs, one wearing a lion skin.  The second plate has three cherubs in the sky with a pile of books, and one bearing aloft a caduceus. Above St Paul's in the third plate is a figure of Mercury in Roman costume, with winged boots and hat, holding a caduceus. The central fourth plate has a large decorative cartouche with the word "LONDON" with the arms of the City of London and lion supporters.  A winged figure, possibly Fame, blows a trumpet at the top of the fifth plate.  The sixth plate has three more cherubs, carrying a chain, a crown, a jewel chest, and a bird.  The seventh plate has a river god above a 34 line Latin poem by Edward Benlowes, with another cherub in the sky above, dressed as an American Indian and leading with an ostrich.

Hollar's panorama was preceded by the Visscher panorama of 1616, which straightens out the river so buildings on each bank are displayed in a line, and John Norden's Civitas Londini of 1600, both of which are composite drawings made from a variety of different viewpoints.  Hollar published another panorama of London and Westminster in 1666, showing views of the city from Lambeth "before" and "after" Great Fire of London.

Two of Hollar's preliminary sketches were sold at Sotheby's in 1931, and are now held by the Yale Center for British Art.

A 1661 reprint by Justus Danckerts has a few changes, with a maypole in Covent Garden, a dome for St Paul's, and the Monument.  An accurately copied lithograph was printed by Robert Martin in 1832.

References
 A Descriptive Catalogue of the Etched Work of Wenceslaus Hollar 1607-1677, Richard Pennington], p. 175-6
 "A New Hollar Panorama of London", John Orrell, The Burlington Magazine, Vol. 124, No. 953 (Aug., 1982), pp. 498–499 and 501-502
 Lithographed copy of Wenceslaus Hollar's 1647 Long View of London, by Robert Martin, 1832, Museum of London
 The Prospect of London and Westminster taken from Lambeth by W Hollar, c.1647, British Museum
 London [the long view], British Museum
  Sheet 1 and 7, 1864,0813.331, British Museum
 Sheet 2, 1864,0611.434 British Museum
 Sheet 3, 1864,0611.435 British Museum
 Sheet 4, 1864,0611.436 British Museum
  Sheet 5, 1864,0611.437 British Museum
  Sheet 6, 1864,0611.438 British Museum
 View from Southwark Cathedral, c.1666, Museum of London
 A true and exact propect of the famous citty of London ... before the fire [and] ... after the sad calamitie [sic], British Museum
 Out of the shadows, Veronica Horwell on Gillian Tindall's life of the elusive artist Wenceslaus Hollar, The Man Who Drew London, The Guardian, 19 October 2002
 After Wenceslaus Hollar A Panoramic View of London in 1647, and other views of London, 29 September 2010
 A View from St. Mary's, Southwark, Looking Towards Westminster, The Yale Center for British Art 
 View of the East Part of Southwark, Looking Towards Greenwich, The Yale Center for British Art

Further reading
 R. Godfrey, 'Wenceslaus Hollar: A Bohemian Artist in England', New Haven and London, 1994, nos.62-64.

Landscape prints
London in popular culture
1647 works
17th-century etchings